Nyx is a comic book character created by Brian Holguin who appears in the Spawn series as an ally of Al Simmons (Spawn), and in Bomb Queen as an adversary of the Desarak and ally of Editor Girl. She first appears in Spawn #122. She reappears in issue #169 and plays a major role in subsequent issues, mainly as Spawn's sidekick.

Fictional character biography
Carrie Ann began practicing magic by herself when she was four. She took her pseudonym from the Nyx, the Greek Primordial goddess of night.

During her first appearance, she helps Al Simmons recover his hellspawn suit, and the two become lovers. Wondering if her friend Thea is suffering in Hell, she asks Spawn to show her and suffers a seizure from the glimpse of Hell.

A Thousand Clowns
While Spawn faces Violator and loses, Nyx is tempted by Mammon, who finds her while looking for Spawn.

With the help of Mammon, she steals a part of Spawn's Necroplasmic energy, gaining Hellspawn powers and a Symbiote suit. While in hell, she allies with the Redeemer, who helps her in her journey. She finally finds her friend's soul and releases both the soul and the Redeemer, who faces Spawn when he tries to take his revenge against Nyx.

After Spawn defeats the Redeemer, Mammon reminds her that she betrayed Spawn for her own purpose, and he takes her magical powers away as a payment and punishment.

Voodoo Child
After the Armageddon and the White Light phenomena, she manages her way to New Orleans and meets a Voodoo Mambo called Suzanne Lefèvre, who believes that the angel that saved the world is a Loa. Nyx visits a faux Houngan who possessed Zera's head, in an attempt to retrieve her lost magick. As soon as her severed head is seen, Zera possesses Nyx's body and kills the Houngan.

As Spawn is summoned by Mambo Lefèvre, he defends against Zera, refusing to actually harm Nyx. During the battle, Spawn states that he has forgiven Nyx for her actions. Mambo Lefèvre takes Zera's head and throws it to Mammon's beasts, which rids Nyx of the possession. After the battle, Mammon returns Nyx's magick to her, and Nyx learns of Al Simmons' worst crime.

A Tale of Three Brothers
Nyx played a crucial role in the arc "A Tale of Three Brothers" when Spawn himself was taken captive by the sin eater demons who fed on the past faults of the victim. Using her magick - which has become more potent, surprising even her - she was able to overcome the several sin eaters to release Spawn and Richard Simmons, Al Simmons' brother. She then sets up a barrier preventing Ab and Zab from leaving the house where the conflict occurred. Her powers also became instrumental in finding Al Simmons' parents who were trapped in a curse set up by Mammon preventing them from leaving their house and backyard, while making them invisible to the rest of the world.

Monster in the Bubble
In the arc "Monster in a Bubble" Nyx assisted in combating a killer who preyed on the winners of a manga contest attacking Erskine's psychic emanations. Her powers also allowed Spawn/Al Simmons to gain the assistance of his brother Marc Simmons who was investigating the murders.

Bad Blood
When in a new effort to control Spawn, Mammon restores his individuality to the K7 Leetha necroplasm suit.  This reveals that as a part of his centuries-long plan to create the perfect Hellspawn, he had forged an alliance with the suit. The suit, necessitating a temporary host, and acting out of spite, possesses Nyx, this time taking total control over the young woman and cutting her off from her nature-based magic.

The End

In issue 184, Nyx learns a spell that Cyan had obtained from the future. A power that she supposedly gains in the future. With this spell she seals away both Morana and Mammon, leaving them in web-like cocoons in limbo. She along with Cyan and Wanda return to Earth.

Return
Nyx later returns in the recent Spawn Issues. She was seen in hiding from the forces of heaven and hell. She was later killed in 300. Then in issues 332,333,and 334 Nyx returns with a redesign against Al for cantering the world.

Powers and abilities
Nyx is a Wiccan, depicted by the pentagram she always wear around her neck. She uses a vast magic spells repertory. Although her magic ability is powerful, her spells and the way she uses them are mainly defensive. She is capable of healing, mind controlling, removing illusions and projecting magical force fields. At attacking, she only wields a knife.

After stealing Spawn's energy, she gained access to a symbiote suit similar to a Hellspawn, with increased reflexes, strength and magical ability; also gave her the signature chains of a Hellspawn. However this does not make her a true Hellspawn due to the absence of a necroplasmic body.

Nyx also has a sidekick raven named Nightbird. Although it doesn't provide any offensive support, it still helps in finding places and people. Spawn has the ability to see the world through other "dark natured" animals like rats, bugs, bats and crows, finding Nightbird quite useful when finding Ab and Zab in the Tale of three brothers arc.

During the Suicide Bombers arc of Bomb Queen, Nyx is described as having retained a thread from the K7 Leetha necroplasmic suit of Spawn, and able to tap into its power to project her soul in the infernal dimension of Desaraak, granting herself part of the She-Spawn powers.

References

External links
Comic Vine:Nyx 
The Art of Spawn: A Wishlist, Nyx the She-Spawn 
Spawn Comics: Chronology and Checklist of Spawn in Comics 

Spawn characters
Comics characters who use magic
Comics characters introduced in 2003
Characters created by Todd McFarlane
Comic book sidekicks
Fictional witches